This is a list of songs written about the U.S. state of Ohio:

Liz Phair Cinco de Mayo 1994

References

Ohio
Music of Ohio
Songs
Songs about Ohio